The alternative yeast nuclear code (translation table 12) is a genetic code found in certain yeasts.  However, other yeast, including Saccharomyces cerevisiae, Candida azyma, Candida diversa, Candida magnoliae, Candida rugopelliculosa, Yarrowia lipolytica, and Zygoascus hellenicus, definitely use the standard (nuclear) code.

The code

   AAs  = FFLLSSSSYY**CC*WLLLSPPPPHHQQRRRRIIIMTTTTNNKKSSRRVVVVAAAADDEEGGGG
Starts = -------------------M---------------M----------------------------
 Base1 = TTTTTTTTTTTTTTTTCCCCCCCCCCCCCCCCAAAAAAAAAAAAAAAAGGGGGGGGGGGGGGGG
 Base2 = TTTTCCCCAAAAGGGGTTTTCCCCAAAAGGGGTTTTCCCCAAAAGGGGTTTTCCCCAAAAGGGG
 Base3 = TCAGTCAGTCAGTCAGTCAGTCAGTCAGTCAGTCAGTCAGTCAGTCAGTCAGTCAGTCAGTCAG

Bases: adenine (A), cytosine (C), guanine (G) and thymine (T) or uracil (U).

Amino acids: Alanine (Ala, A), Arginine (Arg, R), Asparagine (Asn, N), Aspartic acid (Asp, D), Cysteine (Cys, C), Glutamic acid (Glu, E), Glutamine (Gln, Q), Glycine (Gly, G), Histidine (His, H), Isoleucine (Ile, I), Leucine (Leu, L), Lysine (Lys, K), Methionine (Met, M), Phenylalanine (Phe, F), Proline (Pro, P), Serine (Ser, S), Threonine (Thr, T), Tryptophan (Trp, W), Tyrosine (Tyr, Y), Valine (Val, V).

Differences from the standard code

Alternative initiation codons
 CAG may be used in Candida albicans.

Systematic range
 Endomycetales (yeasts): Candida albicans, Candida cylindracea, Candida melibiosica, Candida parapsilosis, and Candida rugosa.

See also
 List of genetic codes

References

Molecular genetics
Gene expression
Protein biosynthesis